Sky Pilot Mountain may refer to:

 Sky Pilot Mountain (Montana)
 Sky Pilot Mountain (British Columbia)